Power Lunches Arts Café was a music venue, rehearsal space, and creative hub located on Kingsland Road in Dalston, a district of the London Borough of Hackney. It opened in 2011 and closed in 2015. It started out with gigs planned to be only at weekends, but later became a prominent feature of Hackney’s DIY music scene with gigs most nights every week. Though originally genuinely also a café, it eventually stopped serving food.

The cafe hosted performances in its basement, the maximum capacity of which was 150. These were most often concerts by local bands, but also saw acts from elsewhere in the UK, as well as further afield.

Staff of the venue hosted a radio show showcasing the type of musicians to appear there on NTS Radio between 2012 and 2015.

Some artists to play Power Lunches

Big Joanie
Maria Chavez
A.G. Cook
Crywank
Desperate Journalist
Doe
Empress Of
Evans The Death
Fear of Men
Flemmings
Gnarwolves
Good Throb
Joanna Gruesome
Neils Children
Rolo Tomassi
Sauna Youth 
Sean Nicholas Savage
SOPHIE
Shopping
The Ethical Debating Society
The Spook School
Verity Susman
Ian Svenonius
Trash Kit
Ultimate Painting
Willis Earl Beal
Witching Waves
White Lung
Wolf Girl

References

Music venues in London
Nightclubs in London
Defunct nightclubs in the United Kingdom
Underground punk scene in the United Kingdom
Dalston